Herman Creek is a creek located in Multnomah County, Oregon, in the Columbia River Gorge. The East Fork Herman Creek is a major tributary that begins at Mud Lake and joins the main stem approximately halfway between Hicks Lake and the Columbia River, separated by Woolly Horn Ridge and Tomlike Mountain. The watershed is bounded by the Benson Plateau to the west, Nick Eaton Ridge and Green Point Mountain to the east, and Chinidere Mountain and Waucoma Ridge to the south.

The creek and the surrounding areas are located in the Mt. Hood National Forest and comprise a popular recreation destination. The Herman Creek Trail #406 runs for 10.5 miles along the East Fork from an Interstate 84 frontage road to a junction with the Pacific Crest Trail near Chinidere Mountain. Multiple other trails are also present on the surrounding ridges and mountains, providing connections to the rest of the Gorge's trail network.

References

Columbia River Gorge
Rivers of Hood River County, Oregon
Rivers of Oregon
Tributaries of the Columbia River